Gillian Robespierre (born June 29, 1978) is an American director and writer, known for writing and directing the films Obvious Child and Landline.

Early life

Robespierre was born to a Jewish family and raised in New York City. In 2005 she graduated from the School of Visual Arts, where she majored in Film and Video.

Career
Robespierre began her career working as a production assistant on big budget features like American Gangster. She also worked for the Directors Guild of America until 2014.

In 2009, Robespierre co-wrote (with Anna Bean and Karen Maine) and directed the short film Obvious Child, about a young woman who is impregnated after a one-night stand and decides to have an abortion. Robespierre approached Jenny Slate to star in the lead role after seeing her perform at a comedy club. Robespierre later expanded the short into her 2014 feature film debut Obvious Child with Slate once again playing the lead role. The film premiered at the 2014 Sundance Film Festival where it was acquired by A24 Films.

In early 2015, Robespierre announced she was developing a comedy pilot for FX with Elisabeth Holm, who co-wrote Obvious Child, starring Jenny Slate and Ari Graynor. Robespierre's second film, Landline, premiered at the Sundance Film Festival on January 20, 2017, followed by a theatrical release on July 21, 2017. The film stars Jenny Slate, Abby Quinn, Edie Falco, John Turturro, and Jay Duplass.

It was announced in January 2021 that Robespierre would direct an adaptation of Melissa Broder's novel The Pisces, about a woman and her "erotic infatuation with a merman". The film will star Claire Foy.

Filmography

As director 
Television

Casual (4 episodes) (2017–18)
 Crashing (6 episodes) (2018–19)
 Silicon Valley (1 episode) (2018)
 Jenny Slate: Stage Fright (2019)
 Shrill (1 episode) (2019)
 Mrs. Fletcher (2 episodes) (2019)
 A Teacher (2 episodes) (2020)
 Only Murders in the Building (2 episodes) (2021)
 And Just Like That... (2 episodes) (2021)
 Everything's Trash (1 episode) (2022)
 The Answers (1 episode) (TBA); also executive producer

References

External links

American women film directors
School of Visual Arts alumni
Living people
Film directors from New York City
Film producers from New York (state)
American women film producers
Writers from Brooklyn
1978 births
Jewish American writers
21st-century American Jews
21st-century American women